Drillia fraga is a species of sea snail, a marine gastropod mollusk in the family Drilliidae.

Description
The length of the shell attains 22 mm, its diameter 8 mm.

(Original description) The shell has an elongated fusiform shape. It is deep reddish brown. It contains 7 whorls, rather flat, sculptured with regular closely set rows of small white tubercles and bearing a single, infra-sutural row of coarser tubercles between which and the remaining smaller rows there is a broad but shallow groove. The sutures are impressed. The aperture is obliquely ovate. The siphonal canal is short.

Distribution
This marine species occurs off the Andaman Islands

References

  Tucker, J.K. 2004 Catalog of recent and fossil turrids (Mollusca: Gastropoda). Zootaxa 682:1–1295

External links
 

fraga
Gastropods described in 1908